Dniprovahonmash is a rail freight rolling stock manufacturer based in Ukraine.

Products and customers
The company produces flat wagons (for containers, steel, lumber, vehicles and piping), gondola wagons, box wagons, hopper wagons, and dumping wagons for a variety of different materials. It also produces specialised wagons for incandescent coke and hot metal billets, and bunker cars for asphalt.

The company produces vehicles for the CIS and Baltic States, China, India, Pakistan, Iran, Bulgaria, Slovakia, Yugoslavia, Cuba, Egypt, Algeria, Guinea and Nigeria, as well as having licensing agreements in China, Germany and South Africa.

References

Rolling stock manufacturers of Ukraine
Kamianske
Ministry of Heavy and Transport Machine-Building (Soviet Union)
Manufacturing companies of the Soviet Union